Meakins is a surname. Notable people with the surname include:

Felicity Meakins, Australian linguist
Ian Meakins (born 1956), British businessman
Jonathan Campbell Meakins (1882–1959), Canadian doctor and author
Jonathan Larmonth Meakins (born 1941), Canadian surgeon and academic